Grandpré may refer to:
A. Jean de Grandpré, a Canadian lawyer and businessman
Louis de Grandpré, a French naval officer
Louis-Philippe de Grandpré
Mary GrandPré
Grandpré, Ardennes, a commune in northern France

See also 
 Grand-Pré (disambiguation)